The 1976–77 Boston Bruins season was the Bruins' 53rd season in the NHL. The season involved participating in the Stanley Cup finals.

Offseason

NHL Draft

Regular season

Season standings

Schedule and results

Player statistics

Regular season
Scoring

Goaltending

Playoffs
Scoring

Goaltending

Playoffs
Boston Bruins vs. Montreal Canadiens

Montreal wins the series 4–0.

Guy Lafleur won the Conn Smythe Trophy as playoff MVP.

Awards and honors
John Bucyk, Lester Patrick Trophy

References
 Bruins on Hockey Database

Boston Bruins seasons
Boston Bruins
Boston Bruins
Adams Division champion seasons
Boston Bruins
Boston Bruins
Bruins
Bruins